This is a list of the Fall 1977 PGA Tour Qualifying School graduates.

The event was held at Pinehurst Resort in North Carolina. There were 144 players in the event. The top 30 players would earn playing privileges for the PGA Tour. The length of the tournament was reduced from 108 holes to 72 holes. According to the Associated Press, recent two-time NCAA champion Scott Simpson and 1976 U.S. Amateur champion Bill Sander were considered the favorites. In addition, former All-Americans from Oklahoma State University–Stillwater, Tom Jones and Jaime Gonzalez, were also "expected to succeed."

Tournament summary 
In the first round Rick Beck of Geneva, Alabama shot a 68 (−4) to take a one-stroke lead over a number of players. After the first two rounds Ed Fiori and Len Mickles held the joint lead at 139. Fiori's round of 66 was the tournament's best so far. It concluded five consecutive birdies. In the third round, playing amidst "cold weather and chilling winds," Fiori and Mickles expanded their lead with rounds of 73 (+1). At 212 (−4), they held a two shot lead over Gary Jacobson. Skeeter Heath was in fourth place at this point, three back, tied with Jeff Hewes and Parker Moore. In the final round, Fiori shot a "steady" even-par 72 while Mickles "faltered" on the final hole ensuring that Fiori was medallist. Fiori finished at 284 (−4), the only player under par, and defeated Mickles by four.

Sander failed to qualify. He was at the cut-off point after 16 holes of the final round. However, he shot five-over-par over the final two holes to miss qualifying by five strokes. Simpson also failed to qualify. He was especially hurt by a septuple-bogey 12 on the par-5 12th hole during the first round. Among the players from Oklahoma State, Jones failed to earn playing privileges but Gonzalez was successful.

List of graduates 

Source:

References

1977 2
PGA Tour Qualifying School Graduates
PGA Tour Qualifying School Graduates